Interstate 35 (I-35) is an Interstate Highway that stretches from Laredo, Texas, in the south to Duluth in the north. North of Kansas City, the highway travels north-northeast toward the Iowa state line near Eagleville, paralleling U.S. Route 69 (US 69).

Route description

Kansas City metropolitan area
After merging with Southwest Trafficway (exit 1A) and Broadway Boulevard (exit 1B), it becomes an eight-lane freeway and continues north to downtown, where it serves as the west and north legs of the Downtown Loop. After leaving the loop, I-29 begins, and I-35 runs concurrent with it. Both Interstates, together, cross the Missouri River on the Christopher S. Bond Bridge.

Daviess and Harrison counties
I-35 continues north from Cameron, intersecting US 69 (exit 61) as it crosses from the west- to the eastside of the highway before intersecting Route 6 (exit 64), providing access to Weatherby to the west of I-35. The Route 6 exit also provides access to the Interstate 35 Speedway, located in Winston. North of the interchange with Route 6, US 69 intersects I-35 again (exit 68) and, for the remainder of its route, stays to the west of I-35. Between Route DD (exit 72), providing local access to farmland, and Route C (exit 78), providing access to Pattonsburg, I-35 crosses the Grand River west of the Elam Bend Conservation Area. A final interchange with Route B and Route N (exit 80), providing access to Coffey, mark the last exit inside of Daviess County, and I-35 enters Harrison County.

Route AA and Route H (exit 84), which provides access to Gilman City to the east, are the first interchange with in Harrison County as I-35 continues northeasterly through northern Missouri, intersecting Route 13 (exit 88) south of the county seat, Bethany. Two interchanges provide access to Bethany, one with US 136 (exit 92) and one with U.S. Route 69 Spur (US 69 Spur, exit 93). Route A (exit 99) provides access to the town of Ridgeway to the east of the Interstate, and Route N (exit 106) further north provides access to Eagleville to the west and Blythedale to the east. Rest stops for both directions of travel are north of Route N, as well as a welcome center for motorists traveling southbound before intersecting US 69 (100th Street, exit 114) before crossing into Iowa.

History

Exit list

Related routes

Cameron business route

Major intersections

Auxiliary Routes
I-35 has two auxiliary routes in Missouri:
: The Kansas City beltway
: Bypass of downtown Kansas City providing a connection between the KC Northland and Overland Park, Kansas

See also

References

External links

I-35 on Missouri Highways Route Log

 Missouri
35
Transportation in Jackson County, Missouri
Transportation in Clay County, Missouri
Transportation in Clinton County, Missouri
Transportation in DeKalb County, Missouri
Transportation in Daviess County, Missouri
Transportation in Harrison County, Missouri